The 1984 Scottish Cup Final was played on 19 May 1984 at Hampden Park in Glasgow and was the final of the 99th Scottish Cup. The previous year's winners and defending champions in the match were Aberdeen who had beaten Rangers in the 1983 final. Aberdeen had beaten Dundee 2–0 in their semi-final to reach the final whereas Celtic had beaten St Mirren 2–1. The holders, Aberdeen and Celtic, contested the match; Aberdeen won the match 2–1, their goals were scored by Eric Black and Mark McGhee.  This marked three consecutive Scottish Cup wins for Aberdeen.

Match details

Road to the final

References

1984
Cup Final
Scottish Cup Final 1984
Scottish Cup Final 1984
20th century in Glasgow
May 1984 sports events in the United Kingdom